Iuput or Auput was a personal ancient Egyptian name mainly used during the Third Intermediate Period of Egypt. Some notable bearers were:

Iuput (A), High priest of Amun in Thebes during the 22nd Dynasty
Iuput I, pharaoh, coregent of Pedubast I of the 23rd Dynasty
Iuput II, ruler of Leontopolis at the end of the 23rd Dynasty